The Danone Nations Cup is a football tournament for children between the ages of 10 and 12 (U12s category); it is organized every year since 2000 on the initiative of Groupe Danone.

Every year, 2.5 million children from over 34,000 schools and 11,000 clubs from around the globe take part in local, regional and then national Danone Nations Cup competitions, before the winners fly off to compete in the grand World Final. In each of the 32 participating countries, Danone's subsidiaries organize their national tournaments in partnership with the local Sports Federations and/or State Education and Sports Ministers.

For 10 years, the tournament has had Zinédine Zidane as its ambassador, benefiting from his commitment to high quality football and fair play.

History
Following the 1998 FIFA World Cup in France, Danone decided to create an international football tournament for kids.

Danone Nations Cup World Final was in France (Paris or Lyon) until 2009. The World Finals of the 10th and 11th editions took place at the Orlando Stadium in Johannesburg, South Africa: the same year as the FIFA Football World Cup. The Santiago Bernabéu Stadium in Madrid in 2011 and the National Stadium in Warsaw in 2012 also hosted the competition. For the 14th edition, the thirty - two winning national teams headed to the legendary Wembley Stadium in London. In 2014, the World Cup of the young people took place in Brazil.

Over the years, the tournament has established itself as a highly respected event with FIFA endorsement. It now enjoys a solid reputation within the world of professional football and partner organizations.

In 2013, the final was goalless (0-0) but France overcame Brazil after a penalty shoot-out. France won its 3rd Danone Nations Cup. South Africa, France and Mexico are the only teams to have won the tournament 3 times each.

Results

Boys

Participating nations
Legend

 – Champions
 – Runners-up
 – Third place
 – Fourth place
 – Losing semi-finals
QF – Quarter-finals
GS – Group stage

Q — Qualified for upcoming tournament
 – Did not qualify
 – Withdrew
 – Hosts

Girls

Participating nations
Legend

 – Champions
 – Runners-up
 – Third place
 – Fourth place
 – Losing semi-finals
QF – Quarter-finals
GS – Group stage

Q — Qualified for upcoming tournament
 – Did not qualify
 – Withdrew
 – Hosts

See also
FIFA

References

External links
 

International association football competitions hosted by France
Groupe Danone